EMCA can refer to:

 East Memorial Christian Academy, a former private K-12 Christian school in Autauga County, Alabama
 Eastern Manitoba Concert Association, an association in Pinawa, Canada, which hosts concerts in a Pinawa's community centre
 Emeralda Marsh Conservation Area, a U.S. conservation area
 Advanced emergency medical care assistant, a credential used for emergency medical technicians in Ontario, Canada
 Epithelial-myoepithelial carcinoma, a rare malignant tumour that typically arises in a salivary gland
 Ethnomethodology and conversation analysis, two fields of study sometimes considered as one field and referred to as EMCA
 Ethnomethodology and conversation analysis, an application area within social media, ubiquitous computing, and instant message based social commerce
 Eugene Masonic Cemetery, the oldest chartered cemetery in Eugene, Oregon, United States
 European Mosquito Control Association, an association for mosquito control
 European Multisport Club Association, a sports organization representing the interests of multisport clubs in Europe

See also 
 ECMA (disambiguation)
 Emcas